Blackridge Wilderness is a  wilderness area in the state of Utah. It was designated March 30, 2009, as part of the Omnibus Public Land Management Act of 2009.  Located adjacent to the Kolob Canyons section of Zion National Park, it protects a Black Ridge, formed by the Hurricane Fault, as well as a long stretch of LaVerkin Creek, a tributary of the Wild and Scenic Virgin River. Blackridge Wilderness is bordered by the Zion Wilderness to the northeast.

Flora and fauna
Ecosystems in the Blackridge Wilderness range from low desert at the bottom of LaVerkin Creek, through pinyon-juniper woodlands in the middle elevations, and ponderosa pine, Douglas fir, and aspen forests at the highest elevations. Hanging gardens grow on some canyon walls. The wilderness and creek also offer habitat for mountain lion, mule deer, many species of raptor, and numerous small animals.

See also
 List of U.S. Wilderness Areas
 Wilderness Act

References

External links
 "Blackridge Wilderness". Wilderness.net.
 "Map of wilderness areas in northeastern Washington County, Utah".

Wilderness areas of Utah
Zion National Park
Protected areas of Washington County, Utah
Bureau of Land Management areas in Utah